Galbo (Italian) or Galbó (Catalan) is a surname. Notable people with the surname include:
Cristina Galbó (born 1950), Spanish actress
Luciano Galbo (1943–2011), Italian racing cyclist

See also
Rick Galbos (born 1951), American footballer

Catalan-language surnames
Italian-language surnames